Sanjay Kumar Singh is an Indian politician, currently a member of Bharatiya Janata Party and a Member of the Legislative Assembly (India) from Lalganj, Bihar (Vidhan Sabha constituency).

References 

Living people
Bihar MLAs 2020–2025
Bharatiya Janata Party politicians from Bihar
1968 births